Vītoliņš (Old orthography: Wihtolin; feminine: Vītoliņa) is a Latvian topographic surname, derived from the Latvian word for "willow" (vītols). Individuals with the surname include:

Alvis Vītoliņš (1946–1997), Latvian chess master;
Harijs Vītoliņš (born 1968), Latvian ice hockey player

See also 
Vītols

Latvian toponymic surnames
Latvian-language masculine surnames